Diorite is an unincorporated community in Marquette County in the U.S. state of Michigan.  The community is located within Ely Township.  As an unincorporated community, Diorite has no legally defined boundaries or population statistics of its own.

History
Diorite contained a post office between 1888 and 1940. The community was named for deposits of the diorite rock in the area.

References

Unincorporated communities in Marquette County, Michigan
Unincorporated communities in Michigan